Kugul (Kügel) is a rural locality (a village) in Tanovsky Selsoviet, Blagovarsky District, Bashkortostan, Russia. The population was 71 as of 2010. There is 1 street.

Geography 
Kugul is located 19 km north of Yazykovo (the district's administrative centre) by road. Viktorovka is the nearest rural locality.

References 

Rural localities in Blagovarsky District